Bougou is a town in the far north of Ivory Coast. It is a sub-prefecture of M'Bengué Department in Poro Region, Savanes District. Five kilometres northwest of town is a border crossing with Mali.

Bougou was a commune until March 2012, when it became one of 1126 communes nationwide that were abolished.

In 2014, the population of the sub-prefecture of Bougou was 14,160.

Villages
The 6 villages of the sub-prefecture of Bougou and their population in 2014 are:
 Bougou (3 583)
 Loulo (2 729)
 M'brigue (4 151)
 N'gandana (2 128)
 Nongon (952)
 Tehekaha (617)

Notes

Sub-prefectures of Poro Region
Former communes of Ivory Coast